Common name: two-headed snakes.
Chilorhinophis is a genus of venomous snakes endemic to Africa. Currently, three species are recognized.

Species

*) Not including the nominate subspecies.
T) Type species.

See also
 Snakebite.

References

Further reading
Branch, Bill (2004). Field Guide to Snakes and other Reptiles of Southern Africa. Third Revised Edition, Second impression. Sanibel Island Florida: Ralph Curtis Books. 399 pp. . (Genus Chilorhinophis, p. 67).
Loveridge A (1958). "Revision of Five African Snake Genera". Bulletin of the Museum of Comparative Zoology at Harvard College 119: 1-198. (Genus Chilorhinophis, pp. 168–169).
Werner F (1907). "Ergebnisse der mit Subvention aus der Erbschaft Treitl unternommenen zoologischen Forschungreise Dr. Franz Werner's in den ägyptischen Sudan und nach Nord-Uganda. XII. Die Reptilien und Amphibien ". Sitzungsberichte der Mathematisch-Naturwissenschaftlichen Klasse der Kaiserlichen Akademie der Wissenschaften [Vienna] 116: 1823-1926 + Plates I-IV. (Chilorhinophis, new genus, p. 1881). (in German).

Atractaspididae
Snake genera
Taxa named by Franz Werner